Wrath of God may refer to:

 Suffering construed as divine retribution 
 Operation Wrath of God, an Israeli covert operation
 The Wrath of God, a 1972 Western film
 Aguirre, the Wrath of God, a 1972 epic historical drama film

See also
 Wrath of Gods, a 2006 documentary film
 The Wrath of the Gods (disambiguation)